
Gmina Łodygowice is a rural gmina (administrative district) in Żywiec County, Silesian Voivodeship, in southern Poland.

Villages
Gmina Łodygowice contains the villages and settlements of Bierna, Łodygowice, Pietrzykowice and Zarzecze.

Neighbouring gminas
Gmina Łodygowice is bordered by the town of Żywiec and by the gminas of Buczkowice, Czernichów, Lipowa and Wilkowice.

Twin towns – sister cities

Gmina Łodygowice is twinned with:
 Gogolin, Poland
 Kysucké Nové Mesto, Slovakia

References

Lodygowice
Żywiec County